Thomas Maier (born 18 April 1998) is an Austrian footballer currently playing for DSV Leoben.

References

External links
 
 Thomas Maier at ÖFB

1998 births
Living people
Austrian footballers
Kapfenberger SV players
DSV Leoben players
2. Liga (Austria) players
Austrian Regionalliga players
Association football forwards